The 2010 ASP World Tour was a season of professional competitive surfing run by the World Surf League. Men and women compete in separate tours with events taking place from late February to mid-December, at various surfing locations around the world.

Surfers receive points for their best events. The surfer with the most points at the end of the tour is announced the 2010 ASP world champion.

Men's Championship Tour

Tournaments
(*) denotes wildcard surfer
Source

Final standings
Source

Women's Championship Tour

Tournaments
Source

Final standings
Source

External links
 Official Site

World Surf League
ASP World Tour